The Amphibious Reconnaissance and Patrol Unit (ARP) is an elite special operations component of the Republic of China Marine Corps.

Overview
ARP members are known as frogmen and have a similar mission set to the United States Navy SEALs. The entire ROC Marine Corps is considered an elite force, and the ARP is the most elite unit within the Marines. The ARP operates both reconnaissance and underwater demolition teams.

New members of the Coast Guard's Special Task Unit undergo three months of training with the ARP followed by two months with the Republic of China Military Police Special Services Company.

History

In 2018, the MOD began construction of a NT$134.25 million maritime special operations training base as well as a NT$698.04 million special operations training base slated specifically for ARP use.

See also
 Airborne Special Service Company
 Thunder Squad
 List of military special forces units

References

Special forces units of the Republic of China
Republic of China Navy
Naval special forces units and formations
Armed forces diving
Reconnaissance units and formations
Marine corps units and formations